This page is an overview of the protected heritage sites in Namur (province), alphabetically ordered by town name. This list is part of the protected heritage sites of Belgium.

List of protected heritage sites, in Andenne
List of protected heritage sites, in Anhée
List of protected heritage sites, in Assesse
List of protected heritage sites, in Beauraing
List of protected heritage sites, in Bièvre
List of protected heritage sites, in Cerfontaine, Belgium
List of protected heritage sites, in Ciney
List of protected heritage sites, in Couvin
List of protected heritage sites, in Dinant
List of protected heritage sites, in Doische
List of protected heritage sites, in Éghezée
List of protected heritage sites, in Fernelmont
List of protected heritage sites, in Floreffe
List of protected heritage sites, in Florennes
List of protected heritage sites, in Fosses-la-Ville
List of protected heritage sites, in Gedinne
List of protected heritage sites, in Gembloux
List of protected heritage sites, in Gesves
List of protected heritage sites, in Hamois

List of protected heritage sites, in Hastière
List of protected heritage sites, in Havelange
List of protected heritage sites, in Houyet
List of protected heritage sites, in Jemeppe-sur-Sambre
List of protected heritage sites, in La Bruyère, Belgium
List of protected heritage sites, in Mettet
List of protected heritage sites, in Namur (city)
List of protected heritage sites, in Ohey
List of protected heritage sites, in Onhaye
List of protected heritage sites, in Philippeville
List of protected heritage sites, in Profondeville
List of protected heritage sites, in Rochefort, Belgium
List of protected heritage sites, in Sambreville
List of protected heritage sites, in Sombreffe
List of protected heritage sites, in Somme-Leuze
List of protected heritage sites, in Viroinval
List of protected heritage sites, in Vresse-sur-Semois
List of protected heritage sites, in Walcourt
List of protected heritage sites, in Yvoir

 
 *Namur